Jarno Opmeer (born 11 April 2000) is a Dutch esports driver and former racing driver and is the 2020 and 2021 Formula One Esports Champion. He also competes in the Formula E: Accelerate Series with Mercedes-EQ.

Career

Formula 4
Opmeer graduated to single-seaters in 2016, participating in the SMP F4 Championship. He took seven victories and thirteen podiums in his debut year F4 finishing in second place in the championship to his fellow countryman Richard Verschoor.

Opmeer also participated in two race meetings of the Spanish F4 with MP Motorsport, taking 5 podiums out of 6 races.

Formula Renault
In 2017, Opmeer continued his collaboration with MP and joined the Eurocup championship. He had seven point-scoring finishes including the 5th place in the penultimate race of the season at Circuit de Barcelona-Catalunya. While in the standings he ended fifteenth, behind his teammates Richard Verschoor and Neil Verhagen.

Formula One
In February 2017, Opmeer was inducted into the Renault Sport Academy. In the end of 2017 Opmeer confirmed that the contract he had with the Renault Sport Academy hadn't been extended.

Esports
In April 2019, Opmeer was signed to Renault–Vitality Esports Team as a driver for the third season of the F1 Esports Series. The Dutchman finished his first season in the competition in fourth place and helped secure his team 4th place in the teams' championship.

For the 2020 Formula One Esports Series he moved to the Alfa Romeo Orlen Esports Team. He was the class of the field in 2020 taking 4 wins and the drivers championship with it. He beat Frederik Rasmussen of Red Bull Racing Esports to the drivers' crown by 22 points and also helped his team secure 2nd in teams' championship.

On 26 January 2021, Opmeer announced that he has signed with the Mercedes Formula One Esports team. On 16 December 2021, Opmeer won the 2021 Formula One Esports Series.

Racing record

Karting career summary

Racing career summary 

† – As Opmeer had not competed in the required number of rounds, he was ineligible for a championship position.

Complete SMP F4 Championship results
(key) (Races in bold indicate pole position) (Races in italics indicate fastest lap)

Complete F4 Spanish Championship results
(key) (Races in bold indicate pole position) (Races in italics indicate fastest lap)

† – As Opmeer had not competed in the required number of rounds, he was ineligible for a championship position.

Complete Formula Renault Eurocup results
(key) (Races in bold indicate pole position) (Races in italics indicate fastest lap)

Esports career summary

Complete Formula One Esports Series results
(key) (Races in bold indicate pole position) (Races in italics indicate fastest lap)

Complete Formula E: Accelerate Series results 
(key) (Races in bold indicate pole position) (Races in italics indicate fastest lap)

References

External links
 
Official website
https://www.youtube.com/channel/UCf5VvF2uO6KyFk1v_t1pnFw Youtube Channel

2000 births
Living people
Sportspeople from Dordrecht
Dutch racing drivers
Karting World Championship drivers
Formula Renault Eurocup drivers
Spanish F4 Championship drivers
SMP F4 Championship drivers
Formula Renault 2.0 NEC drivers
MP Motorsport drivers
Team Vitality players
Dutch esports players